Baiyyappanahalli railway station (station code: BYPL) is an Indian Railways train station located in Baiyyappanahalli, Bangalore  in the Indian state of Karnataka which is located about 13 km away from the Bangalore City railway station and serves Baiyyappanahalli, Indiranagar, Krishnarajapuram and HAL areas.

Development
South Western Railway (SWR) developed Baiyyappanahalli, located on the eastern part of the city, as the third railway terminal for the city along with facilities in 2008 due to no space around the Bangalore City railway station. Work on a third coaching terminal has begun and is expected to be complete by March 2020. It is a Railway Junction, dividing the direct single electrified line to Salem via Hosur-Dharmapuri and the electrified double line towards Jolarpettai via Krishnarajapuram.

Structure 
Baiyyappanahalli railway station is designed to be a replica of the Terminal 1A building of the Kempegowda International Airport, located in the same city. The station has two platforms and 4 tracks each running to 650m in length along with shelters, lighting, benches and a booking office Facilities such as parking, footbridge or Skyway and toilets are available.

See also 
Baiyyappanahalli
Bengaluru Commuter Rail
Baiyappanahalli metro station
 List of railway stations in India

References

External links 

Unreserved Ticket Booking

Railway stations in Bangalore
Bangalore railway division
Railway stations opened in 2008